Dendrobium distichum is a species of plant in the family Orchidaceae endemic to the Philippines.

References 

distichum
Endemic orchids of the Philippines
Plants described in 1827